The South West Cup is one of the 21 regional cup competitions of German football. The winner of the competition gains entry to the first round of the German Cup. It is limited to clubs from the Rheinhessen-Pfalz region of Rhineland-Palatinate, however, teams from the Bundesliga and 2. Bundesliga are not permitted to compete. It is one of two cup competitions in the state, the other being the Rhineland Cup, which covers roughly the northern half of the state.

The competition is sponsored by the Bitburger brewery and carries the name Bitburger-Verbandspokal. It is operated by the South West German Football Association, the SWFV.

History
The Cup was established in 1973. The South West Cup is played annually.

From 1974 onwards, the winner of the South West Cup qualified for the first round of the German Cup.

Since the establishment of the 3. Liga in 2008, reserve teams can not take part in the German Cup anymore, but are permitted to play in the regional competitions. For the 2007–08 cup winner, 1. FC Kaiserslautern II, this meant the runners-up, SV Niederauerbach, was qualified instead for the 2008–09 DFB-Pokal.

Modus
Clubs from fully professional leagues are not permitted to enter the competition, meaning, no teams from the Bundesliga and the 2. Bundesliga can compete.

All clubs from the South West playing in the 3. Liga (III), Regionalliga West (IV), Oberliga Südwest (V), Verbandsliga Südwest (VI) and the two Landesligas (VII) gain direct entry to the first round. Additionally, all clubs that have reached the quarter finals of the two Bezirkspokale, the two regional cup competitions staged for teams below the'Landesligas, also enter the competition. In 2007, for example, 129 clubs took part. The lower classed team always receives home advantage, except in the final, which is played on neutral ground.

Cup finals
Held annually at the end of season, these were the cup finals since 1974:

Winners
Listed in order of wins, the Cup winners are:

1 Includes three wins by 1. FSV Mainz 05
2 Includes two wins by 1. FC Kaiserslautern

References

Sources
Deutschlands Fußball in Zahlen,  An annual publication with tables and results from the Bundesliga to Verbandsliga/Landesliga, publisher: DSFS

External links
Fussball.de: South West Cup 
South West Football association website: List of Cup winners 

Recurring sporting events established in 1973
Football cup competitions in Germany
Football competitions in Rhineland-Palatinate
1973 establishments in West Germany
Palatinate (region)